Al-Washm Football Club is a professional football club based in Shaqra, that plays in the Prince Mohammad bin Salman League, the second tier of Saudi football. It was founded in 1967.

Al-Washm's colors are white, orange and blue. Al-Washm have won the Saudi Second Division once in the 2017–18 season and won their first promotion to the Prince Mohammad bin Salman League on 18 March 2018.

The club play their home games at their own stadium, Al-Washm Club Stadium, in Shaqraa.

Current squad 
As of 2 February 2019:

Stadium

References 

Football clubs in Saudi Arabia
Football clubs in Shaqraa
Association football clubs established in 1967
1967 establishments in Saudi Arabia